The 1999–2000 Sporting de Gijón season was the second consecutive season of the club in Segunda División after its last relegation from La Liga.

Overview
After the 33rd round, Pedro Braojos was sacked and Ciriaco Cano, former player of the club, replaced him at the helm of the first squad.

Squad

From the youth squad

Competitions

La Liga

Results by round

League table

Matches

Copa del Rey

Matches

Squad statistics

Appearances and goals

|}

References

External links
Profile at BDFutbol
Official website

Sporting de Gijón seasons
Sporting de Gijón